Crowded House are an Australasian rock band.

Crowded House may also refer to:

 Crowded House (album), the band's eponymous debut album, 1986
 Crowded House (horse) (foaled 2006), a British Thoroughbred racehorse